Roßkopf, Rosskopf or Roskopf may refer to:

People
Erik Rosskopf (born 1965), U.S. Virgin Islands swimmer
Georges Frederic Roskopf (1813–1889), German-Swiss watchmaker and inventor of the pin-pallet escapement
a name for the pin-pallet escapement he devised
Joey Rosskopf (born 1989), American cyclist
Jörg Roßkopf (born 1969), German table tennis player and coach
Matías Roskopf (born 1998), Argentine footballer
Wendel Roskopf (1480–1549), stonemason and master builder

Mountains or hills in Germany and Austria
 Rosskopf (Carnic Alps), 2,603 m, mountain in the Carnic Alps in Austria
 Roßkopf (Ötztal Alps), 2,390 m, mountain in the hiking area of Hochötz near Oetz in Austria
 Roßkopf (Stubai Alps), Monte Cavallo, 2,189 m, mountain and ski region near Sterzing
 Roßkopf (Allgäu Alps), 1,958 m,  mountain in the Allgäu Alps near Hinterstein
 Roßkopf (Kitzbühel Alps), 1,731 m, mountain in the Kitzbühel Alps in the municipality of Wildschönau
 Roßkopf (Bavaria), 1,580 m, mountain in the Spitzingsee region in the Bavarian Alps
 Roßkopf (Bavarian Prealps), 891 m, mountain between Walchensee and Kochelsee
 Roßkopf (Breisgau), 737 m, mountain in the Black Forest
 Roßkopf (Taunus), 632 m, mountain in the Hochtaunuskreis between Wehrheim and Bad Homburg, Germany
 Roßkopf (Spessart), 516 m, hill in the Spessart on the Bavarian-Hessian border 

German-language surnames